William Molyneux (1656–1698) was an Irish natural philosopher and writer on politics.

William Molyneux may also refer to:

 William Molyneux, 4th Viscount Molyneux (1655–1717)
 William Molyneux, 7th Viscount Molyneux (1685–1759), Jesuit priest
 Sir William Molyneux, 6th Baronet (died 1781), High Sheriff of Nottinghamshire 1737
 William Molyneux, 2nd Earl of Sefton (1772–1838), sportsman, gambler and a friend of the Prince Regent
 William Molyneux, 4th Earl of Sefton (1835–1897), British peer
 Bill Molyneux (William Mitchell Molyneux, born 1935), Australian horticulturist and author

See also 
 Molyneux